Philadelphia German-American was an American soccer club based in Philadelphia, Pennsylvania that was an inaugural member of the professional American Soccer League.

Before the 1941/42 season the club became known as the Philadelphia Americans. During the 1953/54 season, the franchise was bought by a trucking magnate and renamed the Uhrik Truckers.

The team earned a "mini-double" in 1955 winning the league championship and league cup (the Lewis Cup). The club also won the National Amateur Cup in 1933 and 1934 and the Lewis Cup in 1941, 1943 and 1958.

Year-by-year

Coaches
 Jimmy Mills 1956-

References

American Soccer League (1933–1983) teams
Defunct soccer clubs in Pennsylvania
Soccer clubs in Philadelphia
1933 establishments in Pennsylvania
1966 disestablishments in Pennsylvania
Association football clubs established in 1933
Association football clubs disestablished in 1966
Works soccer clubs in the United States
U.S. Open Cup winners